Susi Nicoletti (3 September 1918 – 5 June 2005) was a Bavarian-born actress best remembered today for over 100 supporting roles mostly in comedy films. She was born as Susanne Emilie Luise Adele Habersack in Munich, but spent most of her childhood with her parents in Amsterdam. Back in Munich, she made her stage debut at age 13. Two years later she became a ballerina.

In the early 1930s she turned to cabaret. In 1939, she was offered her first film role. In 1940 she moved to Vienna, where she became a member of the Burgtheater. After her retirement in 1992 she continued her stage career at the  Theater in der Josefstadt. For decades, Nicoletti taught acting and dance at the prestigious Max Reinhardt Seminar in Vienna. Her husband, Ernst Haeussermann, was a theatre director.

Death
Nicoletti died in Vienna of complications after heart surgery, aged 86. Her son, daughter and grandchildren live in the United States.

Selected filmography

 A Mother's Love (1939) - Franzi Pirlinger - 1922
 Das jüngste Gericht (1940) - Marianne Strubel
 Oh, diese Männer (1941) - Lilly
 Sommerliebe (1942) - Irma
 Der zweite Schuß (1943) - Irene Neuhaus
 The Singing House (1947) - Fritzi, Sekretärin
 Umwege zu dir (1947)
 Gottes Engel sind überall (1948) - Liesl Fischer
  (1949) - Berthe Paradis
  (1949) - Pucki Hildebrand
 Nothing But Coincidence (1949) - Liane Reitmayer
 Kleiner Schwindel am Wolfgangsee (1949) - Anny Bird
 Mein Freund, der nicht nein sagen konnte (1949) - Elfi
  (1950) - Hedy Jaconis
 No Sin on the Alpine Pastures (1950) - Annerl Pfundhammer
 Der alte Sünder (1951) - Yvonne Farini
 Eine Frau mit Herz (1951) - Hilde Straßmeier
 Eva erbt das Paradies (1951) - Daisy Jordan
 Hallo Dienstmann (1952) - Susi
 Voices of Spring (1952) - Rosi
 Ideal Woman Sought (1952) - Chérie
 The Day Before the Wedding (1952) - Frl. Kluge
  (1953) - Yvonne
 Irene in Trouble (1953) - Vera Cirmann
 Grandstand for General Staff (1953) - Frau Rittmeister v. Mirkowitsch
 Hochzeit auf Reisen (1953) - Ly Ballacz
 Roses from the South (1954) - Janine Rocca
 Kaisermanöver (1954) - Gräfin Trangini
 Schützenliesel (1954) - Cornelia
 The Blue Danube (1955) - Gräfin Eichenfels
 Marriage Sanitarium (1955) - Amanda Dietze
 One Woman Is Not Enough? (1955) - Madame Colette
 Die Deutschmeister (1955) - Comtess Nanette
 Yes, Yes, Love in Tyrol (1955) - Barbara Tusma
 Sonnenschein und Wolkenbruch (1955)
 Symphonie in Gold (1956) - Mathilde Seidlitz
 ...und wer küßt mich? (1956) - Kitty Lindner
 Liebe, die den Kopf verliert (1956) - Baronin Jasmin von Arnau
 Lügen haben hübsche Beine (1956)
 Ein tolles Hotel (1956) - Anna Bender
 Die Rosel vom Schwarzwald (1956) - Vera
 Ein Mann muß nicht immer schön sein (1956) - Marla Carlotti
 Uns gefällt die Welt (1956) - Reseda
 The Beautiful Master (1956) - Lisa
 Die liebe Familie (1957) - Maria Jurancy
 August der Halbstarke (1957) - Mimi Rums
 Zwei Herzen voller Seligkeit (1957) - Frau von Gregory
 The Winemaker of Langenlois (1957) - Stefanie Köster, Weinhändlerin
 Confessions of Felix Krull (1957) - Madame Houpflé
 Wie schön, daß es dich gibt (1957) - Jeanette Valeur
  (1957) - Baronin
 Egon, der Frauenheld (1957)
 The Count of Luxemburg (1957) - Caroline, Erbgräfin von Luxemburg
 Ein Amerikaner in Salzburg (1958) - Frau Coopers Hausdame
 Man ist nur zweimal jung (1958) - Marie-Therese
  (1958) - Isabella
  (1958) - Jenny Dill
  (1958) - Leonie von Heymendorf
  (1959) - Milli
 Hula-Hopp, Conny (1959) - Diana Haller
 Immer die Mädchen (1959) - Sportlehrerin Florence Henderson
 Dream Revue (1959) - Frau Schmitt
 I'm Marrying the Director (1960) - Frau von Wittekind
 Crime Tango (1960) - Frau Schleinitz
 The Adventures of Count Bobby (1961) - Mrs. Evelyn Piper
  (1961) - Gräfin von Kokowsky
 Mariandl (1961) - Franzi
 Ein Stern fällt vom Himmel (1961) - Katie Held
 Die Fledermaus (1962) - Baroness Martens
 The Turkish Cucumbers (1962) - Susanne, seine Gattin
 Das ist die Liebe der Matrosen (1962) - Tante Agathe
 Mariandls Heimkehr (1962) - Franzi
 Schweik's Awkward Years (1964) - Amanda Hruschkowitz
 I Learned It from Father (1964) - Dora Bauer
  (1972) - Therese
 The Mimosa Wants to Blossom Too (1976) - Emily Hopkins
 Feuerwerk (1976) - Mutter
 Tödliche Liebe (1995)
 Das zehnte Jahr (1995) - Guest
 Comedian Harmonists (1997) - Frau Grunbaum
 On the Other Side of the Bridge (2002) - Old Fanny

Decorations and awards
 1977 - Austrian Cross of Honour for Science and Art, 1st class
 1978 - Gold Medal of Honour of the capital Vienna 
 1997 - Nestroy Ring
 2000 - Platinum Romy for lifetime achievement
 2004 - Undine Award - for your life's work as a young supporter
 2005 - Gold Medal of the City of Vienna

External links

Photographs and literature

1918 births
2005 deaths
Actresses from Amsterdam 
People from the Kingdom of Bavaria
Austrian ballerinas
Austrian film actresses
Austrian television actresses
20th-century Austrian actresses
German ballerinas
German film actresses
Recipients of the Austrian Cross of Honour for Science and Art, 1st class
Recipients of the Romy (TV award)
German emigrants to Austria
German expatriates in the Netherlands
20th-century German ballet dancers
Burials at Döbling Cemetery